Colônia 31 de Março Biological Reserve was a biological reserve in Brazil.

History

An audit in 2012 stated that a number of biological reserves created in 1974 on state-owned land were being re-assessed, since they no longer qualified as conservation units.
These were Carmo da Mata, Colônia 31 de Março and others.
As of 2016 the reserve did not appear on the list of biological reserves in the state.

Notes

Sources

Biological reserves of Brazil
Protected areas of Minas Gerais
Protected areas established in 1974
1974 establishments in Brazil
Protected areas of the Atlantic Forest